Gig Harbor is the name of both a bay on Puget Sound and a city on its shore in Pierce County, Washington,. The population was 12,029 at the 2020 census.

Gig Harbor bills itself as "the Maritime City" and maintains a strong connection to its maritime heritage. Due to its close access to several state and city parks, and historic waterfront that includes boutiques and fine dining, it has become a popular tourist destination. Gig Harbor is located along State Route 16, about 6 mi (10 km) from its origin at Interstate 5, over the Tacoma Narrows Bridge. A $1.2 billion project to add a second span to the bridge was completed in 2007.

History

During a heavy storm in 1840, Captain Charles Wilkes brought the captain's gig (small boat) into the harbor for protection. Later, with the publication of Wilkes' 1841 map of the Oregon Territory, he named the sheltered bay Gig Harbor.

In 1867, fisherman Samuel Jerisich came to the Gig Harbor area, along with many other immigrants from Sweden, Norway, and Croatia.  The town was platted in 1888 by Alfred M. Burnham.

Gig Harbor was officially incorporated on July 12, 1946. Commercial fishing, boat building, and logging dominated the economy until the construction of the first Tacoma Narrows Bridge in 1940. Until then, the primary method of transportation between Gig Harbor and the economic center of nearby Tacoma was by steamship. Starting in 1836, steamships started plying the waters of Puget Sound and quickly developed into what was eventually dubbed the "Mosquito Fleet".  Gig Harbor, isolated from Tacoma and Seattle by Puget Sound and the Tacoma Narrows, could not be reached by automobile or horseback except by a very long and arduous trip south around Puget Sound and Hammersly Inlet. The boom was to be short lived, as the Tacoma Narrows Bridge collapsed just months after it was completed. The resource demands of World War II prevented another bridge from being built until 1950. Between the time when the first bridge collapsed and when the second bridge was completed, a state-run ferry service delivered drivers directly into downtown Gig Harbor. Remains of the ferry dock can still be seen just outside the mouth of the harbor at the southeast end of Harborview Drive. The area has been turned into a small park, where the public can see a panoramic view of the Cascade Mountains, Point Defiance, and Mount Rainier.

After the completion of the replacement bridge in 1950, Gig Harbor and the surrounding area quickly began to develop as a suburb of neighboring Tacoma. First, the area had substantial residential development as families retreated from Tacoma in favor of the tree-lined neighborhoods and waterfront lots available on the Gig Harbor Peninsula. What had once been summer cabins became primary residences for people who commuted daily over the bridge to Tacoma. Medium-sized housing development sprang up across the peninsula. The 1980s and 1990s had substantial retail development near State Route 16 to serve the growing residential population, shifting the economic center of Gig Harbor out of downtown. For some time, city leaders were unsure how to handle the growth while maintaining the character of the city. Ultimately, the city decided to aggressively annex the surrounding rural areas and convert them into high-density commercial and housing districts, forever changing the rural character of the area, but assuring that little new development happens in the historic downtown area, preserving its history and charm. By the 1970s, local merchants had begun actively promoting the downtown area for its historic value, and tourism became prominent on the list of economic engines in Gig Harbor. Today, downtown Gig Harbor is a very active place for tourists with shopping, dining, and recreation on every block. The last large swath of undeveloped waterfront property at the south end of downtown was recently developed into the headquarters of the Russell Foundation, named for George Russell, founder of Russell Financial.

Today, despite a long history of boat building, very little manufacturing exists in Gig Harbor. The only remaining boatbuilder is Gig Harbor Boatworks, which builds rowing and sailing dinghies in classic style using modern materials. Until recently, Tiderunner Boats maintained a manufacturing facility at the north end of the bay. The historic Skansie boatyard is now primarily a maintenance facility for yachts and pleasure craft. The Glein/Eddon/Gig Harbor boatyard was recently purchased by the city after spending many years sitting idle. The city intends to use it as a working waterfront museum.

Commercial fishing is still of great cultural, if somewhat lesser economic, importance to Gig Harbor, and many commercial fishing boats make it their home port. Most, however, do not rely on Puget Sound to gather their catch, instead finding it more profitable to venture north to Alaska to fish in the summer. Gig Harbor's fishing fleet still gathers the first weekend in June (during the Maritime Gig Festival) in the center of the bay for the annual Blessing of the Fleet ceremony. In recent years, due to the dwindling number of remaining fishing boats, pleasure craft have been allowed to participate in the ceremony, somewhat lessening its authenticity, but increasing its visibility and participation.

A new Tacoma Narrows Bridge has been built alongside the existing bridge and opened July 2007, doubling past capacity.

Skansie shipyard
In 1905, the Skansie brothers were the first in the area to build a gasoline-powered fishing boat. They did so at first by refitting boats with a gasoline-powered engine. Usually the motors were quite small, between 6 and 8 horsepower; the Skansie brothers originally used a 7-horsepower engine. Although these were powerboats, neither masts nor a turntable to hoist in the nets were used. This work was all done by hand. However, with the introduction of a motor, the boats were not able to go as far as Alaska. Skansie shipyards built fishing vessels from the late 1910s to the early 1950s.
Vessels built by Skansie:
 F/V Genius – being refitted by grandson of original owner
 F/V Shenandoah – being restored as a museum piece for the Harbor History Museum
 F/V Supreme – registered in Canada as Supreme No. 1
 F/V Advocator – sunk in early 2000s in Bellingham
 F/V Veteran – still has permits to fish, was donated to the Gig Harbor Boat Shop and is used to educate people about commercial fishing
 F/V Greyling – registered with state of Alaska as F/V Taylor Maid
 F/V Emancipator – serves as tender vessel in Friday Harbor for San Juan Island salmon seining
 F/V Avalon – Resided in Port Townsend, later demolished by state
 F/V Vernon – active in Puget Sound and South East Alaska Seining

Geography

Climate

Gig Harbor has a marine west coast climate: Warm and dry summers, transitional springs and autumns, and cool and wet winters, with occasional snow.

Demographics

2010 census
As of the census of 2010, 7,126 people, 3,291 households, and 1,937 families resided in the city. The 3,560 housing units averaged . The racial makeup of the city was 90.2% White, 1.2% African American, 0.6% Native American, 2.4% Asian, 0.5% Pacific Islander, 1.4% from other races, and 3.6% from two or more races. Hispanics or Latinos of any race were 5.8% of the population.

Of the 3,291 households, 22.2% had children under the age of 18 living with them, 46.7% were married couples living together, 9.0% had a female householder with no husband present, 3.1% had a male householder with no wife present, and 41.1% were not families. About 34.2% of all households were made up of individuals, and 17.1% had someone living alone who was 65 years of age or older. The average household size was 2.12 and the average family size was 2.69.

The median age in the city was 48.1 years; 18% of residents were under the age of 18; 7% were 18 to 24; 21% were  25 to 44; 29% were  45 to 64; and 25% were 65 years of age or older. The gender makeup of the city was 46% male and 54% female.

2000 census
As of the census of 2000, 6,465 people, 2,880 households, and 1,765 families resided in the city. The population density was 1,485.2 people per square mile (573.8/km2). The 3,085 housing units averaged 708.7 per square mile (273.8/km2). The racial makeup of the city was 94.2% White, 1.1% African American, 0.6% Native American, 1.5% Asian, 0.2% Pacific Islander, 0.5% from other races, and 1.8% from two or more races. Hispanics or Latinos of any race were 3.0% of the population.

Of the 2,880 households, 25.1% had children under the age of 18 living with them, 50.0% were married couples]living together, 9.0% had a female householder with no husband present, and 38.7% were not families. Around 33.2% of all households were made up of individuals, and 16.4% had someone living alone who was 65 years of age or older. The average household size was 2.16 and the average family size was 2.75.

In the city, the population was distributed as 20.3% under the age of 18, 7.1% from 18 to 24, 23.5% from 25 to 44, 25.7% from 45 to 64, and 23.4% who were 65 years of age or older. The median age was 45 years. For every 100 females, there were 83.4 males. For every 100 females age 18 and over, there were 78.9 males.

The median income for a household in the city was $43,456, and for a family was $57,587. Males had a median income of $46,250 versus $28,487 for females. The per capita income for the city was $28,318. About 3.5% of families and 5.9% of the population were below the poverty line, including 7.8% of those under the age of 18 and 4.1% of those ages 65 or older.

Government
At the state level, Gig Harbor is part of the 26th Legislative District - which runs from the Tacoma Narrows in the south to Bremerton in the north. It is represented in the Washington State Legislature by Senator Emily Randall (D - Bremerton), Representative Jesse Young (R - Gig Harbor) and Representative Michelle Caldier (R - Port Orchard).

At the House of Representatives, Gig Harbor is part of Washington's 6th Congressional District and is represented by Congressman Derek Kilmer. Gig Harbor is represented in the United States Senate by Patty Murray and Maria Cantwell.

Education
The Peninsula School District is the district covering the city of Gig Harbor and the peninsula. Tacoma Community College opened a satellite campus in Gig Harbor in 1992, and also operates a branch serving Washington Corrections Center for Women, also in Gig Harbor.

High schools
 Gig Harbor High School
 Peninsula High School
 Henderson Bay Alternative High School

Middle schools
 Goodman Middle School
 Kopachuck Middle School
 Key Peninsula Middle School
 Harbor Ridge Middle School
 St. Nicholas Catholic School

Elementary schools
 Artondale Elementary 
 Harbor Heights Elementary 
 Discovery Elementary 
 Pioneer Elementary
 Purdy Elementary 
 Voyager Elementary 
 Vaughn Elementary
 Swift Water Elementary
 St. Nicholas Catholic School

Notable people
 Christophe Bisciglia, founder of Cloudera
 Marian Call, singer-songwriter 
 Jini Dellaccio, photographer 
 Jay Faerber, illustrated book writer
 Freddie Goodwin, former Manchester United soccer player and alumnus of the Busby Babes
 Tally Hall, soccer goalie
 Scott Hatteberg, baseball player, played by Chris Pratt in Moneyball
 Doris Brown Heritage, athlete 
 Kevin Johnson, chief executive officer (CEO) of Starbucks
 Casey Kasem, actor, television and radio voiceover (lived in Gig Harbor until his death in 2014)
 Josh Lucas, actor
 Bob Mortimer, evangelist
 Onision, YouTuber, lives in Gig Harbor
 Cory Procter, former NFL football player
Kenneth Pinyan, deceased former Boeing engineer and horse aficionado, also known as "Mr. Hands"
 Christopher Rufo, conservative activist, senior fellow at the Manhattan Institute
 Austin Seferian-Jenkins, NFL football player
 Paul Skansi, NFL football player
 Kyle Stanley, professional golfer 
 Keith Weller, former soccer player
Charles W. Johnson, jurist and Associate Chief Justice of the Washington Supreme Court
 Howard McLeod, medical scientist
 Dave Krusen, drummer, Rock Hall of Fame member

Media appearances
 The 1973 film Hit! had many scenes filmed in the harbor.
 The 2002 film Enough had select scenes filmed in the city.
 Three episodes of CSI: Crime Scene Investigation included the fictional character "the Gig Harbor killer".
 The 1996 book Into the Wild featured the town.

References

External links

 Official city website
 City of Gig Harbor's Official Visitor Website
 Gig Harbor - Peninsula Area Chamber of Commerce

 
Cities in Pierce County, Washington
Cities in the Seattle metropolitan area
Cities in Washington (state)
Populated places on Puget Sound